The Roscoe Goose House is a historic house at 3012 South Third Street in Louisville, Kentucky.  Built about 1891, it is a -story brick building with Italianate and later Victorian styling.  It has a low-pitch hip roof with bracketed cornice, a wall dormer rising at the center of the front facade, a single-story porch that wraps across the front and around the left side, and a large arched window on the ground floor next to the main entrance.  It was home to jockey Roscoe Goose from 1913 until about 1970.

The house was listed on the National Register of Historic Places in 2015.

See also
 National Register of Historic Places listings in Jefferson County, Kentucky

References

Houses on the National Register of Historic Places in Kentucky
National Register of Historic Places in Louisville, Kentucky
Houses completed in 1826
Local landmarks in Louisville, Kentucky
1826 establishments in Kentucky
Houses in Louisville, Kentucky
Italianate architecture in Kentucky
Horse racing in Louisville, Kentucky